Peter Howard Barton (born 28 March 1941) is a New Zealand former cricketer. He played first-class cricket for Northern Districts and Otago.

Barton was born at Gisborne in 1941. He played Hawke Cup cricket for Poverty Bay in 1959/60, before making his first-class debut for Northern Districts in a Plunket Shield match against Otago in January 1963. He played three matches for Northern Districts before moving to Otago for the 1964/65 season, playing another three matches for the side. He played Hawke Cup cricket for Southland the following season before returning to play for Poverty Bay from 1968/69 until the start of the 1980s. He made two further first-class and two List A cricket appearance for Northern Districts in the 1974/75 season.

Barton's son, Hamish Barton, played first-class and List A cricket for Auckland and Canterbury between 1995/96 and 2000/01 and has also played for the Argentina national cricket team. His brother, Hugh played two first-class matches for Northern Districts in the 1957/58 season.

References

External links
 

1941 births
Living people
New Zealand cricketers
Northern Districts cricketers
Otago cricketers
Cricketers from Gisborne, New Zealand